Giacomo and Giovanni Battista Tocci were conjoined twins born in Locana, Italy  between 1875 and 1877 in either July or October. They toured in a circus and retired about 1900; details of their later lives are uncertain.

Birth 
Their mother Maria Luigia Mezzanrosa was 19 years old; she had an easy time with the birth as they were rather small. They were delivered normally, with one head appearing first, the other head and torso second, and the pelvis and legs third. The one on their right was named Giovanni Battista, and the one on their left Giacomo. They had one umbilical cord and one placenta. Their father Giovanni Tocci had a breakdown due to the appearance of his first-born sons and was put into a lunatic asylum until he recovered a month later.

Early childhood 
The twins' parents did not allow any thorough examination of them as they believed it would diminish their fame. The twins' father took them to Turin to be exhibited in the freak show, where the twins were examined by professors of the Turin Academy of Medicine. The professors determined they would not live long. However, a Paris tour followed, and they were examined by two doctors in Lyon, France. They determined the twins would live long, against the prediction of the professors at the Turin Academy of Medicine. In August 1879, the twins were shown before the Swiss Society of Natural Science. A doctor there also determined they were likely to live. The twins had two heads, two necks, two ribcages that came together at the sixth rib, four arms, and two legs; they had two hearts, two stomachs, two sets of lungs, two separate diaphragms, and a shared large and small intestine. Each twin controlled his respective leg and did not feel his twin's body. For the rest of the 1880s, they were exhibited in most of the major cities in Italy, Switzerland, Germany, Austria, Poland, and France almost every day. Although an English doctor would later state that Giacomo was idiotic and Giovanni intelligent and artistic, every succeeding doctor stated they were both clever. They never learned to walk as they did not have muscular development in their legs due to almost all of their time being exhibited, as it made it easier for their parents to exploit them. Despite this, they could stand by using a chair or another object to balance. To get around, they tumbled about on all six limbs or were transported in a wheelchair.

Adolescence 
The twins spoke Italian, French, and German. They settled disputes between themselves with their fists. While Giovanni liked beer, Giacomo preferred mineral water, he was very talkative while Giovanni was quite quiet. In 1891, the boys came to the United States for an extensive tour and were paid $1000 a week. In March 1892, they arrived in New York City and stayed for three weeks. Their one-year tour turned into a five-year tour as their popularity grew in the United States.

Retirement 
In 1897, the twins decided to retire in Italy, buying a villa in Venice. Then in their 20s, Giovanni and Giacomo became recluses, never leaving the high-walled villa; their experiences in the freak show made them wary of any sort of exhibition. In 1900, it was reported that they were alive and well. In 1904, the brothers married two women. Legal speculation followed; the public did not know what would happen if the twins decided to have children. Later reports contradict each other. One, in 1906, claimed the brothers had died, but in 1911, another report confirmed they were still alive. Again, another report written in 1934 stated that in 1912 they were alive and had children. Still another report claims they died in 1940, childless.

Mark Twain and "Those Extraordinary Twins" 
When the twins went on their American tour, author Mark Twain saw a photograph of "A youthful Italian freak" and decided to write the short story "Those Extraordinary Twins", which later became Pudd'nhead Wilson.

See also

Notes 
 
 
https://web.archive.org/web/20141116061958/http://www.phreeque.com/tocci_brothers.html
http://etext.virginia.edu/railton/wilson/toccitwn.html
https://web.archive.org/web/20100204084017/http://www.quasi-modo.net/Tocci2.html
http://thehumanmarvels.com/?p=71
 
 
 
 

Conjoined twins
1870s births
Date of death unknown
People from the Province of Turin
Italian twins
20th-century deaths
Sideshow performers